Antonio Carannante  is an Italian former football defender who has played for Napoli, Ascoli, Lecce, Piacenza, Avellino and Nola.

Career statistics

External links

1965 births
Living people
Italian footballers
Italy under-21 international footballers
Serie A players
Serie B players
S.S.C. Napoli players
Ascoli Calcio 1898 F.C. players
U.S. Lecce players
Piacenza Calcio 1919 players
U.S. Avellino 1912 players
UEFA Cup winning players
Association football defenders